Walter Horton may refer to:

Big Walter Horton (1921–1981), American blues harmonica player
Walter Horton (landowner) (1512–?), English politician
Walter H. Morton, locomotive engineer
Walter S. Horton (1857–1944), American football player and lawyer